Musninkai is a town in Širvintos district municipality, Vilnius County, east Lithuania. According to the Lithuanian census of 2011, the town has a population of 415 people. The town has a Catholic church.

Its alternate names include Muśniki (Polish), Musnikų, Musninkay, Musninkų, and Musnik (Yiddish).

References

Towns in Vilnius County
Towns in Lithuania
Vilensky Uyezd